Cliff Kelly (1917 – 23 July 1942) was an Australian rugby league footballer who played in the 1940s.

Career
Kelly came to St. George in 1940 from Kurri Kurri, New South Wales. He was a second-row forward who suffered recurring knee injuries that stifled his short career.

Accidental death
In 1942, he was again playing good football in the reserve grade before an accident on a train killed him on 27 July 1942. The train was heading for Tempe railway station when he leaned out of the train and was immediately struck in the head by a passing train. He died at Tempe station while waiting for an ambulance.

The Annual St. George Club Cabaret night was held on 8 August 1942 at Rockdale Town Hall, and all proceeds on the night were donated to Kelly's wife Helen and young son.

Funeral
A large funeral was held at Woronora Crematorium for Kelly, will all members of the St. George Dragons team attending.

References

1917 births
1942 deaths
St. George Dragons players
Australian rugby league players
Rugby league second-rows
Rugby league props
Railway accident deaths in Australia
Accidental deaths in New South Wales